Events in the year 2019 in Egypt.

Events

 27 February – Ramses Station rail disaster: A train smashes into a barrier inside Ramses Station in Cairo, Egypt, causing an explosion and a fire, killing 25 people and injuring 40 others.
 21 June 21 - 2019 Africa Cup of Nations begins.
 4 August – 2019 Cairo bombing: twenty people are killed.
 22 September – Police crack down on protests against President Abdel Fattah el-Sisi. 274 protesters are arrested in Cairo, Suez City, Port Said, Alexandria, and other cities after the actor and contractor Mohamed Ali alleges Sisi and top military officers are enriching themselves by building palaces and hotels.

Deaths

March
 23 March – Abdel Hadi Kandil, chemist and politician (born 1935)

May
 5 May – Hani Shukrallah, journalist (born 1950)

June
 5 June – Mohamed Negm, actor and comedian (born 1944)
 17 June – Mohamed Morsi, former President of Egypt (born 1951)

July
 1 July – Ezzat Abou Aouf, actor (born 1948)
 21 July – Adel Zaky, Roman Catholic prelate (born 1947)
 25 July – Farouk al-Fishawy, actor (born 1952)

September
 4 September – Abdullah Morsi, son of Mohamed Morsi (born 1994)

November
 7 November – Haitham Ahmed Zaki, actor (born 1984)

References 

 
Egypt
Egypt
Egypt